The Ford 7W Ten  is a car built by Ford UK between 1937 and 1938.

The car was an updated version of the Model C Ten with the same 1172 cc engine and three speed gearbox, and used the same transverse leaf front and rear suspension.  The chassis now featured a stiffer braced design, and the brakes were mechanical and bought in from Girling.  The attractive 7W Ten body style, available in both two and four door configurations and the first small English Ford model with an externally accessed luggage compartment, was the precursor to the first model to carry the 'Prefect' badge in 1939 (albeit in four door form only)  and which ran to 1953 as models E93A and E493A. 41,665 7Ws were built.

7W
Cars introduced in 1937